Black Tiger is the fourth studio album by American hard rock band Y&T, released in 1982 through A&M Records. It was recorded at Ridge Farm, in Dorking, County of Surrey, England and produced by Max Norman. The classic Y&T logo makes its first appearance on the cover of this record.

AllMusic named Black Tiger as an extreme disappointment for the band, following the excellent Earthshaker. Eduardo Rivadavia wrote that the songs sound "lifeless" and producer Max Norman is "clueless" about hard rock. The band is blamed for "uneven songwriting": "for every winning track they present Y&T always manages to follow it with a total stinker."

Live performances of "Open Fire" delivered its promise as a massive rocker. When Y&T performed at the 2015 Steelhouse Festival they played every track of Black Tiger except the instrumental. They also played tracks from Earthshaker, Facemelter, and Mean Streak.

Track listing

Personnel
Dave Meniketti – electric lead guitar, lead vocals
Joey Alves – electric and acoustic rhythm guitars
Phil Kennemore – bass, backing vocals
Leonard Haze – drums, percussion

Production
Max Norman – producer, engineer
Bill Freesh – mixing at Record Plant Studios, Los Angeles, California, US
John Taylor Dismukes – illustrations
Chuck Beeson – art direction

References

Y&T albums
Albums produced by Max Norman
A&M Records albums
1982 albums